Orazio Solimena (1690–1789) was an Italian painter. He was the nephew of Francesco Solimena and became his pupil and successor.

Confusion emerged about Orazio's relation to Francesco. Orazio was traditionally accepted as the nephew of Francesco Solimena. In Pavone's English language article on him in Grove Art Online he suddenly emerged as Francesco's grandson. This is based on a translation error as the Italian word "nipote" can mean either, "nephew" or "grandson". In his original Italian language article on Orazio, Pavone makes it very clear that he is, in fact, his nephew.

References

1690 births
1789 deaths
18th-century Italian painters
Italian male painters
People from Nocera Inferiore
18th-century Italian male artists